The South Yorkshire Junction Railway was a railway which ran from Wrangbrook Junction on the main line of the Hull and Barnsley Railway to near Denaby Main Colliery Village, South Yorkshire. It was nominally an independent company sponsored by the Denaby and Cadeby Colliery Company but was worked by the Hull and Barnsley Railway.

History
The S.Y.J.R. received its Act of Parliament on 14 August 1890, and opened for goods traffic on 1 September 1894 and for passengers on 1 December the same year. The passenger service lasted less than 9 years, the last trains running on 1 February 1903. Intermediate passenger stations were at Sprotborough and Pickburn and Brodsworth.

The Hull and Barnsley Railway was absorbed into the North Eastern Railway in 1922 and then to the London and North Eastern Railway at the Grouping.

Infrastructure
A branch to Brodsworth colliery was added in 1908 from Pickburn.

Closure
Goods traffic lasted longer than passenger traffic. Most of the line, including the branch which served Brodsworth Colliery, was closed on 7 August 1967.

A short stub remained after this date, extending northwards from Lowfield Junction, the line's southern connection with the Great Central Railway's Doncaster-Sheffield line just west of Conisbrough station. This section ran to sidings serving a limestone quarry operated by the Steetley Dolomite company.  It saw its last main line traffic in July 1975, although it continued to be used as a link by the National Coal Board to transfer traffic between Cadeby Colliery and Denaby Main Colliery, where the N.C.B. had wagon repair facilities, until the collieries closed in 1986.

References

Acts
South Yorkshire Junction Railway Act, 1890 (53 & 54 Vic., Cap.208) ; An Act to authorise the construction of Railways in the West Riding of the County of York from Wrangbrook to Black Carr Junction with a Branch to Denaby and for other purposes. 

Hull and Barnsley and South Yorkshire Junction Railways Act, 1891 (54 Vic., Cap.164) ; An Act to confirm and give effect to an agreement for the working of certain parts of the South Yorkshire Junction Railway by the Hull Barnsley and West Riding Junction Railway and Dock Company

South Yorkshire Junction Railways Act, 1894 (57 & 58 Vic., Cap.77) ;  An Act to extend the time for the completion of certain authorised railways of the South Yorkshire Junction Railway Company and revive the powers for the purchase of lands for such railways and for other purposes. 

South Yorkshire Junction Railway Act, 1897 (60 & 61 Vic., Cap.8) ; An Act for the abandonment of parts of the Railways authorised by the South Yorkshire Junction Railway Act 1890, and for other purposes

Rail transport in South Yorkshire
Hull and Barnsley Railway
London and North Eastern Railway constituents